The city of Ottawa, Canada held municipal elections on January 3, 1921 to elect members of the 1921 Ottawa City Council.

Mayor of Ottawa
Election day results showed Plant defeating Kent by six votes. A recount showed he won by 22 votes.

Plebiscites

Ottawa Board of Control
(4 elected)

Ottawa City Council
(2 elected from each ward)

References
The Ottawa Evening Citizen, Jan 4, 1921

Municipal elections in Ottawa
1921 elections in Canada
1920s in Ottawa
1921 in Ontario